Tuzkol is a salt lake in Bayanaul District, Pavlodar Region, Kazakhstan.

Geography
Tuzkol lies in a tectonic depression of the Kazakh Uplands to the southwest of the eastern part of the Bayanaul Range and to the east of the Ashchysu river. It is the largest of the lakes of the district.

River Karasu, an intermittent stream, flows into the lake from the east. The water of the lake is saline, containing magnesium and sodium chloride. The mud is used locally for medicinal purposes.

See also
List of lakes of Kazakhstan

References

External links

Ozero Tuzkol’, Pavlodar Region, Kazakhstan

Lakes of Kazakhstan
Pavlodar Region